Diplommatina aurea is a species of land snails with an operculum, terrestrial gastropod molluscs in the family Diplommatinidae. This species is endemic to Palau.

References

Fauna of Palau
Diplommatina
Endemic fauna of Palau
Gastropods described in 1889
Taxonomy articles created by Polbot